Scaphognathops is a genus of cyprinid fishes found in Southeast Asia. Thai vernacular names are pla pak pian, pla pian (ปลาเปี่ยน) or pla ta dam (ปลาตาดำ). It is restricted to Mekong Basin, and not easy to find.

This genus was named by H. M. Smith, an American ichthyologist who lived and worked in Siam (now Thailand). He first intended to name the group Scaphognatus, but this name was already used for a group of prehistoric winged reptiles.

Species
There are currently three species in this genus:
 Scaphognathops bandanensis Boonyaratpalin & Srirungroj, 1971
 Scaphognathops stejnegeri (H. M. Smith, 1931)
 Scaphognathops theunensis Kottelat, 1998

References

 
 

Cyprinidae
Cyprinidae genera
Cyprinid fish of Asia
Fish of the Mekong Basin